Thymus-specific serine protease is an enzyme that in humans is encoded by the PRSS16 gene.

This gene encodes a serine protease expressed exclusively in the thymus. It is thought to play a role in the alternative antigen presenting pathway used by cortical thymic epithelial cells during the positive selection of T cells. 

The gene is found in the large histone gene cluster on chromosome 6, near the major histocompatibility complex (MHC) class I region. A second transcript variant has been described, but its full length nature has not been determined.

References

Further reading

External links